Paul Saintenoy (19 June 1862 – 18 July 1952) was a Belgian architect, teacher, architectural historian, and writer.

Family

Born in 1862 in Ixelles, a municipality of Brussels, Belgium, Saintenoy was the son of the architect Gustave Saintenoy and Adele Cluysenaar, as well as the grandson of the famous architect Jean-Pierre Cluysenaar. The family's residence in Brussels was the Hôtel Saintenoy, which became a listed monument in 1992.

Career
Beginning in 1881, Saintenoy studied architecture at the Royal Academy of Fine Arts in Antwerp, where he received training under the Antwerp architect Joseph Schadde. There he became interested in archaeology and the restoration of monuments from the Middle Ages, an activity in which Schadde was occupied.

He returned to Brussels to complete his training, and in the 1890s, became strongly influenced by the architecture of Victor Horta, Paul Hankar, and the rationalist architectural theories of Eugène Viollet-le-Duc, also famous for his work restoring Gothic buildings. Horta and Hankar's buildings laid the groundwork for the widespread development of the style called Art Nouveau in Belgium and France. Horta's buildings in particular made free and conspicuous use of industrialised methods of construction, with steel frames and large-scale glass panels as infill, allowing for interiors to be bathed in light and in large measure dissolving the boundary between interior and exterior. This became a preferred technique for the construction of retail shop windows and department stores, to encourage the practice of window-shopping.

Though Saintenoy was not nearly as famous as Horta, Hankar, Henry van de Velde or Gustave Serrurier-Bovy, the four most noteworthy practitioners of Art Nouveau in and from Belgium, he was well known at the turn of the century for his numerous buildings that use the style, most notably several smaller townhouses around Brussels, most of which still survive today and form part of the city's important heritage centred around the style. With his interest in archaeology, from the time he served as the general secretary of the Royal Society of Archaeology, he embarked upon a teaching career in 1910, as a professor of the history of architecture at the Académie Royale des Beaux-Arts in Brussels, a position he occupied for some thirty years.

At the end of World War I, Saintenoy was appointed a member of the Royal Commission of Monuments and Sites where he played an important role in the reconstruction of Belgium following the devastation of the war. Saintenoy's house in Brussels became a protected historic monument in 1992. One of his children, Jacques Saintenoy (1895–1947), also became an architect.

Personal life
Saintenoy married Louise Ponselet, who is the niece of Jan Verhas. The little Louise figured on several paintings of her uncle. They had two children:
 Jacques Saintenoy (1895–1947), architect
 Jacqueline Saintenoy (1900–1978), married to the French executed minister Pierre Pucheu

He died in 1952 and was interred in Ixelles Cemetery, his son Jacques was buried in 1947 in the same grave.

Honours
 1932: Commander of the Order of Leopold
 Member of the Royal Academy of Science, Letters and Fine Arts of Belgium

Works
Saintenoy's works include:
 Renovation of the Hôtel Ravenstein, Brussels (1894)
 Old England Department Store, Brussels (1898–99)
 Former Delacre Pharmacy, Brussels (1898)
 Hôtel Baron Lunden, Brussels (1898)
 Maison Losseau, Mons (1899)
 House of J. Van Ophem, Brussels (1900)
 Château Le Fy, Esneux (1904–05)
 Brussels-North railway station: clock tower and ticket hall (1952–1956)

References

1862 births
1952 deaths
19th-century Belgian architects
20th-century Belgian architects
Burials at Ixelles Cemetery
Klausener Family
Members of the Royal Academy of Belgium
Académie Royale des Beaux-Arts alumni
Academic staff of the Académie Royale des Beaux-Arts